Jonas Gemmer (born 31 January 1996) is a Danish footballer who plays as a midfielder who plays for AC Horsens.

Club career

FC Midtjylland
Gemmer made his official debut for FC Midtjylland on 29 August 2013, in a cup match against Vendsyssel FF, at age 17. He made his debut in the Danish Superliga on 16 September 2013 where he was in the line up against FC Nordsjælland.

In the 2013-14 season, Gemmer was nominated as the Academy Player of The Year in FCM. The year before, he won the U17 Player of the Year in FCM. He had trained with the first team squad throughout the season, while playing for the U19 and reserve squad.

In October 2014, Gemmer was rewarded with a new contract that would expire in 2019.

In January 2015, Gemmer was permanently moved to the first team squad, at age 18.

Loans to AC Horsens
On 25 January 2016, it was confirmed, that Gemmer would be loaned out to Danish 1st Division-club AC Horsens for the rest of the season. He got shirt number 14. He got his debut on 20 March 2016 against Vejle Boldklub.

Gemmer was loaned out to AC Horsens again, this time for the whole 2016/17 season. AC Horsens confirmed on 3 May 2017, that they would like to sign Gemmer on a permanent deal, but he wanted to return to FC Midtjylland and play for a bigger club.

Fremad Amager
On 30 May 2017, it was confirmed, that Gemmer had signed for Danish 1st Division club Fremad Amager. The week before, Gemmer's teammate from AC Horsens, Nicklas Dannevang, also joined the club.

In September 2018, Gemmer suffered an anterior cruciate ligament injury which could sideline him for 9–12 months.

On 2 August 2019 the club announced, that Gemmer's contract had been terminated by mutual consent.

Return to AC Horsens
After a trial with AC Horsens, the club announced on 27 August 2019, that they had signed a three-year contract with Gemmer. Gemmer was immediately loaned out to newly promoted Danish 1st Division club Kolding IF to gain some matchfitness after his anterior cruciate ligament injury. On 4 January 2020 Kolding announced, that Gemmer had been recalled by Horsens.

References

External links
 
 Jonas Gemmer on DBU

1996 births
Living people
Association football midfielders
Danish men's footballers
Danish Superliga players
Danish 1st Division players
FC Midtjylland players
AC Horsens players
Fremad Amager players
Kolding IF players
Denmark youth international footballers